The London symphonies, sometimes called the Salomon symphonies after Johann Peter Salomon who introduced London to Joseph Haydn, were composed by Joseph Haydn between 1791 and 1795. They can be categorized into two groups: Symphonies Nos. 93–98, which were composed during Haydn's first visit to London, and Symphonies Nos. 99–104, composed in Vienna and London for Haydn's second visit.

Every London Symphony, apart from No. 95, has a slow introduction to the first movement. 
 Symphony No. 93 in D major (1791)
 Symphony No. 94 in G major, The Surprise (1791)
 Symphony No. 95 in C minor (1791)
 Symphony No. 96 in D major, The Miracle (1791)
 Symphony No. 97 in C major (1792)
 Symphony No. 98 in B major (1792)
 Symphony No. 99 in E major (1793)
 Symphony No. 100 in G major, Military (1793–1794)
 Symphony No. 101 in D major, The Clock (1793–1794)
 Symphony No. 102 in B major (1794)
 Symphony No. 103 in E major, Drumroll (1795)
 Symphony No. 104 in D major, London (1795)

References

 Symphonies by Joseph Haydn
 Music about London